CMS Computers is a manufacturer of desktop, laptop and tablet computers based in Warrington, UK. It primarily trades under the brand Zoostorm. The company was founded in 1993, and acquired by VIP Group in 2011.

In a 2009 press release, CMS Computers cited Microsoft figures placing the company as the fifth largest manufacturer of desktop computers, laptops and servers in the UK, and the third largest manufacturer of Intel-based systems.

References

External links
 
 Zoostorm brand website

British brands
Computer companies of the United Kingdom